
Gmina Siemiatycze is a rural gmina (administrative district) in Siemiatycze County, Podlaskie Voivodeship, in north-eastern Poland. Its seat is the town of Siemiatycze, although the town is not part of the territory of the gmina.

Villages
Gmina Siemiatycze contains the villages and settlements of Anusin, Baciki Bliższe, Baciki Dalsze, Baciki Średnie, Boratyniec Lacki, Boratyniec Ruski, Cecele, Czartajew, Grzyby-Orzepy, Hałasówka, Hryćki, Kadłub, Kajanka, Klekotowo, Kłopoty-Bańki, Kłopoty-Bujny, Kłopoty-Patry, Kłopoty-Stanisławy, Klukowo, Korzeniówka Duża, Korzeniówka Mała, Krasewicze-Czerepy, Krasewicze-Jagiełki, Krupice, Kułygi, Lachówka, Laskowszczyzna, Leszczka, Ogrodniki, Olendry, Ossolin, Rogawka, Romanówka, Siemiatycze-Stacja, Skiwy Duże, Skiwy Małe, Słochy Annopolskie, Stare Krasewicze, Stare Moczydły, Szerszenie, Tołwin, Turna Duża, Turna Mała, Wiercień Duży, Wiercień Mały, Wólka Biszewska, Wólka Nadbużna, Wyromiejki and Zalesie.

Neighbouring gminas
Gmina Siemiatycze is bordered by the town of Siemiatycze and by the gminas of Drohiczyn, Dziadkowice, Grodzisk, Mielnik, Nurzec-Stacja, Platerów and Sarnaki.

References
Polish official population figures 2006

Siemiatycze
Siemiatycze County